Calaguala is an extract from Phlebodium decumanum (syn. Polypodium decumanum), a type of fern used historically for medicinal purposes.

It is also known as kalawalla, and a number of other spellings occur.

See also
Callawalla (disambiguation)

References

Polypodium